Rhagio scolopaceus is a species of fly from the family Rhagionidae. It is also known as the downlooker snipefly. It is the type species of the genus Rhagio.

References

External links

BioLib
Image

Rhagionidae
Brachyceran flies of Europe
Flies described in 1758
Articles containing video clips
Taxa named by Carl Linnaeus